Andy Sherry (born 9 July 1943) was one of the most senior British practitioners of karate and the retired chief instructor of the KUGB.

Biography
Born in Liverpool, Andy Sherry showed an interest in the martial arts as a young man. Initially training in judo and jujutsu, he soon took an interest in karate, starting his study of the art in 1959. In 1966, Sherry became the first person to pass a grading in the UK for a black belt in Shotokan karate, having trained with JKA instructor Keinosuke Enoeda. He graded alongside his Red Triangle clubmate Joseph Chialton on 10 February 1966, with Jack Green earning his blackbelt later that year. Sherry, alongside Jack Green and Eddie Whitcher were also the first to be graded 2nd Dan in the United Kingdom, gaining their grade in 1967 at Crystal Palace.

In 1966, Sherry won the first British all-styles championship, beating competitors from all of Britain's karate styles. He went on, in 1968, to become European champion in kumite, an achievement he repeated in a number of subsequent years. Andy dominated the early KUGB karate championships, winning the kata competition for the first four years running (1967–1970) and the kumite in 1968 and 1970.

On the competition circuit, Andy Sherry was well known for using a yori-ashi gyaku-tsuki (lunging rear-hand punch) as his "trademark" manoeuvre, leading many competitors of the time to joke that he only knew one technique.

Retiring from competition in 1977, Sherry continued to coach the KUGB international competition squad until his retirement. He previously ran his own karate club, the Liverpool Red Triangle. Sherry earned 9th dan (9th level black belt) making him Britain's highest ranking Shotokan karate practitioner in February 2013. He adjudicated many gradings throughout the year in many karate clubs registered under the KUGB.

Andrew Sherry has been charged with gross indecency with a child and inciting a child to commit an act of gross indecency against a boy in the 1980s. The 79-year-old also faces a count of sexual assault on a man in 2012.   Sherry was released on unconditional bail ahead of a further case management hearing on March 13, 2023.

See also
Shotokan
Karate Union of Great Britain

References

External links 
 KUGB Website

1943 births
Living people
British male karateka
Martial artists from Liverpool
Shotokan practitioners